Drapała is a Polish surname. It may refer to:
 Jan Drapała (1899–1945), Polish footballer
 Marika Popowicz-Drapała (born 1988), Polish track and field athlete

See also
 

Polish-language surnames